The Maldives Film Award for Best Director is given as part of the Maldives Film Awards to a director via a jury. The award was first given in 2011. Here is a list of the award winners and the nominees of the respective award ceremonies, classified by the awarded categories.

Winners and nominees

Feature film

Short film

See also
 Maldives Film Awards

References

Maldives Film Awards